This is a list of senior government officials, appointed by State Administration Council following the February 2021 coup d'état. It typically includes military (also known as Tatmadaw) leaders and followers from various opposing parties of former government party of civilian leader, Aung San Suu Kyi. The event is well-known as 2021 Myanmar Coup d'état.

List

See also 
 2021 Myanmar coup d'état

References